12 Angry Men is a 1997 American made-for-television drama film directed by William Friedkin, adapted by Reginald Rose from his original 1954  teleplay of the same title. It is a remake of the 1957 film of the same name.

Plot
In the murder trial of a teenaged boy from a city slum, accused of murdering his father, the judge gives her instructions to the jury: a non-unanimous verdict will force a mistrial, and a guilty verdict will possibly (not mandatorily, unlike in the 1957 film) be accompanied by a death penalty. The jury of twelve retires to the jury room.

An initial vote is taken and eleven jurors vote for conviction. Juror 8, the lone dissenter, states that the evidence is circumstantial and the boy deserves a fair deliberation. He questions the testimony of the two witnesses, and the fact that the switchblade used in the murder is not as unusual as the testimony indicates producing an identical knife from his pocket.

Juror 8 proposes another vote by secret ballot – if the other jurors vote guilty unanimously, he will acquiesce, but if at least one votes "not guilty" they will continue deliberating. Only Juror 9 changes his vote, respecting Juror 8's motives and feeling his points deserve further discussion.

After deliberating whether one witness actually heard the murder take place, Juror 5, who grew up in a slum, changes his vote. Juror 11, questioning whether the defendant would have fled the scene and returned three hours later to retrieve his knife, also changes his vote. Jurors 2 and 6 also vote "not guilty", tying the verdict at 6-6, when Juror 8 demonstrates the unlikelihood that one witness actually saw the boy flee the scene. The remaining jurors are intrigued when Juror 11 proves that although a psychiatric test stated that the boy had subconscious desires to kill, such tests only offer possible actions. Juror 7, impatient to attend a baseball game that night, changes his vote, but Juror 11 chastises him for changing his vote so casually and selfishly when the boy's life is on the line. When pressed by Juror 11, Juror 7 eventually claims that he doesn't think the boy is guilty.

Jurors 12 and 1 change their votes, leaving the only dissenters: Jurors 3, 4, and 10. Outraged at the proceedings, Juror 10 goes on a bigoted diatribe against Hispanic immigrants "outbreeding" African-Americans. He attempts to leverage this with the other African-American jurors, offending the rest of the jury, and Juror 4 finally cuts him off: "Sit down. And don't open your filthy mouth again."

Juror 4 states that despite all the other evidence called into question, the testimony of the woman who saw the murder from across the street stands as solid evidence. Juror 12 changes his vote back to "guilty", making the vote 8-4 again. Juror 9, seeing Juror 4 rub his nose, irritated by his glasses, realizes that the witness had impressions on her nose, indicating that she wore glasses and likely was not wearing them when she saw the murder. Jurors 12 and 4 change their vote to "not guilty". Juror 10, who says he still thinks the defendant is guilty, bluntly admits to no longer caring about the verdict and votes for acquittal.

Undeterred, Juror 3 is forced to present his arguments again, and goes on a tirade, presenting the evidence in haphazard fashion and concluding with his disbelief that a son would kill his own father – mirroring his previous comments about his bad relationship with his own son. He begins to weep, and says he can feel the knife being plunged into his chest. Juror 8 gently points out that the boy is not his son, and Juror 4 pats his arm and says: "Let him live." Juror 3 gives in, and the final vote is unanimous for acquittal.

The jurors leave and the defendant is found not guilty off-screen, while Juror 8 helps the distraught Juror 3 with his coat. In an epilogue, the friendly Jurors 8 (Davis) and 9 (McCardle) exchange names and part ways as we see Juror 3 walks slowly alone.

Cast

The Jury

Others
 Mary McDonnell as Judge Cynthia Nance
 Tyrees Allen as The Guard
 Douglas Spain as The Accused

Awards and nominations 

Ving Rhames won the award for Best Actor – Miniseries or Television Film for his performance in Don King: Only in America. When presented with the award, he summoned Jack Lemmon on to the stage and gifted the award to him, feeling that Lemmon was more deserving of it. Rhames refused to re-accept the award when Lemmon tried to return it to him, meaning that, although Jack Lemmon didn't officially win the Golden Globe Award, he did receive the trophy.

See also
 12 Angry Men (1957 film)

Bibliography
 Friedkin, William, The Friedkin Connection, HarperCollins 2013

References

External links
 
 
 

1997 television films
1997 films
American courtroom films
Films about lawyers
Juries in fiction
Films with screenplays by Reginald Rose
Showtime (TV network) films
Television remakes of films
Twelve Angry Men (1997 film)
Films directed by William Friedkin
1990s American films